World Expansion (subtitled (By the M-Base Neophyte)) is the third album by saxophonist Steve Coleman recorded in 1986 and released on the JMT label.

Reception
The AllMusic review by Michael Erlewine states, "Not his jazziest release, but a lot of good clean funk".

Track listing
All compositions by Steve Coleman except as indicated
 "Desperate Move" - 6:18   
 "Stone Bone Jr." (Coleman, Jimmy Cozier) - 1:13   
 "Mad Monkey" - 3:36   
 "Dream State" (Coleman, Geri Allen) - 6:36   
 "Tang Lung" - 2:49   
 "Yo-Ho" (Kelvyn Bell) - 4:05   
 "And They Partied..." (Allen) - 4:17   
 "In the Park" - 2:09  
 "Just a Funky Old Song" (Graham Haynes) - 2:26   
 "Urilai Thrane" - 1:52   
 "To Perpetuate the Funk" (Kevin Bruce Harris) - 7:02   
 "Koshine Koji" - 1:43   
 "Tlydor's Bane" - 4:17   
 "Park (Pt. II)" - 0:57 Bonus track on CD   
 "Fire Theme (Intro)" - 1:56 Bonus track on CD

Personnel
Steve Coleman - alto saxophone, vocals
Graham Haynes - trumpet
Robin Eubanks - trombone, backing vocals
Geri Allen - keyboards, piano
Kelvyn Bell - electric guitar
Kevin Bruce Harris - electric bass, backing vocals
Mark Johnson - drums
D. K. Dyson (tracks 1, 5, 6, 11 & 13) Cassandra Wilson (tracks 3, 4 & 9), Jimmy Cozier (track 2) - vocals
Malik Cozier, Kelana Jackson, Tameka Jackson - backing vocals (track 2)

References 

1987 albums
Steve Coleman albums
JMT Records albums
Winter & Winter Records albums